Greenoak is an unincorporated community in Bureau County, Illinois, United States,
located north of Dover.

References

Unincorporated communities in Bureau County, Illinois
Unincorporated communities in Illinois